Alžbeta Havrančíková (born 27 September 1963) is a Czechoslovak and Slovak former cross-country skier who competed from 1984 to 2000. Competing in four Winter Olympics, she earned her best finish of sixth in the 4 × 5 km relay at Albertville in 1992 and her best individual finish of eighth in the 15 km event at Lillehammer in 1994.

Havrančíková's best finish at the FIS Nordic World Ski Championships was fourth twice at Lahti in 1989 (10 km, 30 km). She earned two individual World Cup victories (5 km: 1988, 30 km: 1989).

Cross-country skiing results
All results are sourced from the International Ski Federation (FIS).

Olympic Games

World Championships

World Cup

Individual podiums
 2 victories
 3 podiums

References

External links

Women's 4 x 5 km cross-country relay Olympic results: 1976-2002 

1963 births
Cross-country skiers at the 1988 Winter Olympics
Cross-country skiers at the 1992 Winter Olympics
Cross-country skiers at the 1994 Winter Olympics
Cross-country skiers at the 1998 Winter Olympics
Living people
Slovak female cross-country skiers
Czechoslovak female cross-country skiers
Universiade medalists in cross-country skiing
Olympic cross-country skiers of Czechoslovakia
Olympic cross-country skiers of Slovakia
Universiade gold medalists for Czechoslovakia
Competitors at the 1987 Winter Universiade